The Thracians were a group of Indo-European tribes inhabiting a large area in Central and Southeastern Europe, centred in modern Bulgaria. They were bordered by the Scythians to the north, the Celts and the Illyrians to the west, the Greeks to the south, and the Black Sea to the east.

The Thracians were skillful craftsmen. They made beautifully ornate golden and silver objects such as various kinds of vessels, rhytons, facial masks, pectorals, jewelry, weapons, etc. These show strong, and increasing, influence from the neighbouring cultures, especially the Greeks. They used to bury rich hoards of precious objects both to hide them in times of enemy invasions and unrest as well as for ritual purposes. To date, more than 80 Thracian treasures have been excavated in Bulgaria, the cradle of the Thracian civilization. Refer to the map which explicitly shows the territory of present-day Bulgaria.

Thracian treasure hoards
Borovo Treasure
Lukovit Treasure
Panagyurishte Treasure
Rogozen Treasure
Valchitran Treasure

Thracian treasures

See also
Dacian art
Scythian art
Thraco-Cimmerian
Treasure of Nagyszentmiklós
Zoomorphic style

References

Further reading

 The Yurta-Stroyno Archaeological Project. Studies on the Roman Rural Settlement in Thrace. P. Tušlová – B. Weissová – S. Bakardzhiev (eds.). Prague: Charles University, Faculty of Arts, 2022. ISBN 978-80-7671-068‑9 (print), ISBN 978-80-7671-069-6 (online: pdf)

External links

Panagyurishte Treasure
 The Treasures of the Ancient Thracians 
http://www7.nationalgeographic.com/ngm/0612/feature4/
http://www.archaeology.org/0503/abstracts/kitov.html
http://news.bbc.co.uk/2/hi/europe/3999145.stm
http://www.turkishdailynews.com.tr/article.php?enewsid=53342
Golden Thracian Mask, 5th century B.C.

Treasure
Treasure troves of classical antiquity